Calothamnus formosus is a plant in the myrtle family, Myrtaceae and is endemic to the south-west of Western Australia. It is a large, spreading, densely foliaged shrub with almost cylindrical, pointed leaves and red flowers in spring or summer. There are two subspecies, differing mainly in the length of their leaves. (In 2014 Craven, Edwards and Cowley proposed that the species be renamed Melaleuca aglaia.)

Description

The flowers are crimson and arranged in short clusters of 3 to 5, usually on the older, leafless stems. The stamens are arranged in claw-like bundles with 26 to 32 stamens per bundle. The claws are yellow-green near the base but otherwise crimson.

Taxonomy and naming
The specific epithet (formosus) is a Latin word  meaning “beautifully formed” or "handsome".

There are two subspecies:

Distribution and habitat
Calothamnus formosus is found in and between the Shark Bay and Yuna districts in the Carnarvon, Geraldton Sandplains and Yalgoo biogeographic regions. It grows in sand on sandplains.

Conservation
Calothamnus formosus is classified as "not threatened" by the Western Australian government department of parks and wildlife.

References

formosus
Myrtales of Australia
Plants described in 1984
Endemic flora of Western Australia